Anomia may refer to:
 Anomic aphasia, a type of aphasia
 Anomia (bivalve), a genus of bivalve

See also
 Anomie
 Anosmia